Samiilo Vasyliovych Velychko (1670–after 1728 ) — was a Ukrainian Cossack nobleman and chronicler who wrote the first systematic presentation of the history of the Cossack Hetmanate.

Life 
He was born in the family of the Cossack Vasily Velychko in the village of Zhuky of the first hundred Poltava regiment. His father was able to write, was a man of wisdom and respected and had a large library.

Successfully passed entrance exams to the Kyiv-Mohyla Collegium, which at that time was one of the most reputable educational institutions in Europe.

Successfully graduated from college before 1690. From this year he took office as the clerk of the General Military Chancellery, headed by Vasyl Kochubey.

Velichko also fulfilled the special orders of Vasyl Kochubey, "the most necessary and secret at that time military affairs," even those who went to the Russian tsar, and the cipher (encrypted) letters to the owners of Volosky and Muntyansky. Via Velychko there was correspondence, which Ivan Mazepa did not know. In this status, he has served 15 years.

Writings

Honoring memory 

Unfortunately, the grave of Samiilo Velychko has not survived to this day. And in the center of the village Zhuky, on the top, near the chapel of the Protection of the Most Holy Theotokos and the mound of memory, a granite boulder was set up, which symbolizes the last shelter of the famous historian of the Cossack.

Today, in the village where Samiilo Velychko was born, lived and worked, the memorial complex of the glory of the Ukrainian Cossacks was erected. In 2010, the first complex of memory of the dead Cossacks was opened.

In 2003, in order to honor the memory of the glorious Cossack chronicler, the son of Poltava region, and the presentation of the best examples of national culture in the context of the creativity of one of its founders, the regional literary award named after Samiil Wielicz was initiated.

In 2020, the National Bank of Ukraine issued a commemorative silver coin with a face value of ₴10, dedicated to Samiilo Velychko.

References

Literature 
 Velychko, Samiilo.— Internet Encyclopedia of Ukraine, Canadian Institute of Ukrainian Studies
 Encyclopedia of History of Ukraine: 10 volumes.  Величко Самійло Васильович та його літопис //  Енциклопедія історії України : у 10 т. / редкол.: В. А. Смолій (голова) та ін. ; Інститут історії України НАН України. — К. : Наук. думка, 2003. — Т. 1 : А — В. — С. 472. —  
 Velychko S. V. Chronicle. Vol. 1, Vol. 2  Т. 1. / Пер. з книжної української мови, вст. стаття, комент. В. О. Шевчука; Відп. ред. О. В. Мишанич.— К.: Дніпро, 1991.; Літопис. Т. 2. / Пер. з книжної української мови, комент. В. О. Шевчука; Відп. ред. О. В. Мишанич.— К.: Дніпро, 1991.  (т. І)  (т. 2)  
 The village of Zhuky is the birthplace of the chronicler Samiilo Velychko: a collection of materials for the scientific conference.  / Ред. кол.: Л. В. Бабенко, М. М. Кононенко (голова), А. Г. Логвиненко та ін.; О. Б. Супруненко (відп. ред.) / ЦП НАН України і УТОПІК; УК ПОДА; ПКМ імені Василя Кричевського; Полтавська районна рада.— К.; Полтава: ЦП НАНУ і УТОПІК, 2017.— 80 с., іл. 
 Chronicle of events in south-western Russia in the XVIIth century: [in 4 volumes.] / Compiled by Samoil Velichko, former clerk of the office of the Zaporozhsky troops, 1720. Published by the Temporary Commission for the analysis of ancient acts. - Kiev: In the litho-typographical institution of Joseph Wallner; 1848-1864. ;
Samiilo Velychko commemorative silver coin
Т. 1.— 1848.— [4], VIII, 454, 51, [1], XXX, [2] с.
Т. 2. – 1851.— 36, IV, 37-612, XVII, III с.
Т. 3. – 1855.— [6], IV, XII, 5-568, [2] с.
Т. 4. – 1864.— [2], XI, 407, [1] с.

Zaporozhian Cossack nobility
18th-century Ukrainian historians
1670 births
1728 deaths